Freehills was a commercial law firm operating in the Asia-Pacific region. It was known as one of the "Big Six" Australian law firms.

In 2012 it formed Herbert Smith Freehills after a merger with the UK law firm Herbert Smith.

Corporate History
The firm's predecessors include the practices Clarke & Moule in Melbourne (1853), Stephen Henry Parker in Perth (1868), Bernard Austin Freehill in Sydney (1871) and John Nicholson (Perth) 1896.

The Sydney firm became Freehill Hollingdale & Page in 1947 and began to grow under the direction of partner Brian Page, who took the firm into corporate and commercial practice within Australia and internationally. Page was also notable for his "open" employment policy, hiring Catholics and Jews when many other firms would not.

In 1978 Freehill Hollingdale & Page became the first major Australian law firm to appoint a female partner. 

In 1979 Muir Williams Nicholson & Co, Perth signed an agreement with Freehill Hollingdale & Page, Sydney, to create Australia's first national law partnership.

In 2000, the state-based offices of Freehill Hollingdale & Page officially changed their name to Freehills and became a single national legal partnership.

In 2012, the firm has over 800 lawyers and over 190 partners.

Freehills announced in 2012 that it would merge with international law firm Herbert Smith on 1 October 2012, forming a new firm named Herbert Smith Freehills with a single global equity partnership.

Operations

Offices 
Freehills had Australian offices in Sydney, Melbourne, Perth and Brisbane; and an office in Singapore. It was associated with the firm Soemadipradja & Taher in Indonesia, Frasers Law Company in Vietnam, and TransAsia Lawyers in China.

Pro bono services 
Freehills had a pro bono program which, under the leadership of the late Keith Steele, saw the establishment of the Shopfront Youth Legal Centre in Kings Cross.

The firm seconded solicitors to a number of community legal centres and services including the Public Interest Law Clearing House in Victoria, the Kingsford Legal Centre.

References

External links
Freehills website

Law firms established in 1852
Law firms of Australia
1852 establishments in Australia
2012 disestablishments in Australia
Law firms disestablished in 2012